Lambrecht is a Verbandsgemeinde ("collective municipality") in the district of Bad Dürkheim, Rhineland-Palatinate, Germany. The seat of the Verbandsgemeinde is in Lambrecht.

The Verbandsgemeinde Lambrecht consists of the following Ortsgemeinden ("local municipalities"):

Elmstein
Esthal
Frankeneck
Lambrecht
Lindenberg
Neidenfels
Weidenthal

Verbandsgemeinde in Rhineland-Palatinate
Palatinate Forest